Bust a Groove 2 is a 1999 hybrid music fighting video game developed by Metro and published by Enix for the Sony PlayStation and is the sequel to Bust a Groove.

The game takes place one year after the previous installment and shares the same overall gameplay. It combines dance moves and special abilities designed to damage the opponent. It also features new songs, new characters and updated costumes for the returning characters retained from the previous game. A third game in the series, Dance Summit 2001 was only released in Japan on the PlayStation 2.

Gameplay

Bust a Groove 2s gameplay is still the same from the previous title. However, backgrounds have become crazier; if a player attains high scores, background stages will sport crazy effects and changes (see Fever Time).

"The single-player game has changed - it now features branching paths in the single-player game that move you up to more difficult opponents depending on how well you're dancing. The popularity meter has been axed; now your character has a small border around his or her name that changes in color depending on how well you're dancing. Also, a new meter sits in the middle of the screen that tracks every "Cool, Chillin', and Freeze" event and moves up accordingly. When all three bars are filled to capacity, your points are doubled for every dance move made during that time. In Bust a Groove 2 there is a standard two-player versus mode, a practice mode to help you get accustomed to timing the fourth beat, and a dance-view mode that allows you to cycle through each dancer's individual moves and string them together to make your own dances."

The game also included 2 new commands aside the somersault and "Jammer" (attack) moves. This time, the player could now do a 'reflect move' and guard attacks.

Fever Time
If a player obtains a high score by completing a stage with very few mistakes or missed actions, a special dance solo starring the winner of the round takes place immediately after the round ends. This is known as Fever Time.

In some cases, both the winner and loser may dance together during a special Fever Time. This occurs if both players were able to finish the stage with close high scores.

Characters
The initial characters Heat, Hiro, Kelly, Kitty-N, Shorty,Strike and Capoeira were retained from the original Bust a Groove and removed several of the original game's characters which includes Pinky, Hamm, Frida, Gas-O and the secret character Burger Dog (but makes a cameo in Comet's stage). These were replaced by several new characters: Comet, Bi-O, and Tsutomu.

Some new hidden characters were also introduced into the game, and could be unlocked after completing certain tasks. Pander (also a new addition to the cast) and Robo-Z Gold are the only hidden characters that have a unique dance style, other hidden characters merely mimicked other characters' dance moves.

Main

Hidden

Hidden boss

Songs
Some of the songs which were featured in the game were originally in Japanese language and was translated to English for the U.S. release such as: Magic Tower, Moon Light Party, Hello! Kitty-N and Hizashi no oku no Happy Heart. Like the game's predecessor, there is no English OST released.Bi-O - Zombie HopperCapoeira/ChiChi & Sally - Allegretto BreakComet/Sushi Boy - Magic TowerHeat - The Heat Is OnHiro/Hustle Kong - Let the Music Take ControlKelly/McLoad - Moon Light PartyKitty-N/Michael Doi - Hello! Kitty-NShorty/Columbo - Happy Heart in the SunshineStrike - Here Comes TroubleTsutomu - Got to be HappyRobo-Z Gold - Acid LinePander''' - Enka 1
High Voltage - Theme of Bust a Move 2 (Bust a Groove 2) (Opening Theme)
Bust a Groove (Ending Theme)

Changes
The following are several in-game changes made with the English version of the game. Most noticeable is the change of Hiro's symbol due to the age rating concerns.

Aside from changing the language the characters speak to English, several announcer voice overs were still changed though they're already in English (e.g. the voice over in the Mode Select screen). Most likely because of the mentioning of "Bust A Move" which is the Japanese title.
The 2 Player Mode (VS) loading screen was changed.
The arrows appear to be in different colors while the Japanese only bears yellow arrows.
Hiro's character symbol is a cigarette in the Japanese version but instead, was changed into I♥ME for the US version.
The TV Show-esque epilogue, "Dancing Heroes", which shows CG endings of the characters and is hosted by a minor character named "James Suneoka" was entirely removed and instead, only the credits are shown. This may be due to the fact that the endings were already in English and featured numerous inappropriate and sometimes offensive jokes. Prior to the endings, James would say jokes such as needing three more bullets to reunite the Beatles or would get Bi-o's axe stuck in his head with blood squirting out.

Development
The game was in development as early as April 1998.

Reception

In Japan, Game Machine listed Bust a Groove 2 on their September 1, 1999 issue as being the eleventh most-successful arcade game of the month.Next Generation reviewed the PlayStation version of the game, rating it three stars out of five, and stated that "Honestly, the whole game just feels like a retread of a past hit with developers who didn't do anything other than milk the success of the last title. The game is definitely fun for a while, but it's really not the evolution of the series we'd hoped for."Bust a Groove 2'', along with its predecessor, is one of the more valuable PlayStation games on the secondary market. For example, complete, used copies sell for more than $100 which is more than the original MSRP of $35.99.

References

1999 video games
Arcade video games
Dance video games
Enix games
PlayStation (console) games
PlayStation (console)-only games
Square Enix franchises
Video games developed in Japan
Multiplayer and single-player video games
Namco games
Fighting games